The 2015 Sacred Heart Pioneers football team represented Sacred Heart University in the 2015 NCAA Division I FCS football season. They were led by third year head coach Mark Nofri. They played their home games at Campus Field. They were a member of the Northeast Conference. They finished the season 6–5, 3–3 in NEC play to finish in a three way tie for third place.

Schedule

Source: Schedule

References

Sacred Heart
Sacred Heart Pioneers football seasons
Sacred Heart Pioneers football